Screech Lake is a 16-acre lake in Cook County, Minnesota, which is tributary to the Poplar River. Water clarity surveys performed by the University of Minnesota indicated Screech Lake had a visibility of 1.36 meters in 2008, although earlier surveys have yielded values of nearly 5 meters.

References

Lakes of Cook County, Minnesota
Lakes of Minnesota
Superior National Forest